State Highway 30 (SH 30) is a New Zealand state highway, linking the Waikato and Bay of Plenty towns of Te Kuiti, Mangakino, Rotorua, and Whakatane.

At 219 kilometres, SH 30 is New Zealand's fifth longest provincial (two-digit) state highway, after SH 25, SH 35, SH 73, and SH 94.

SH 30 has the most concurrencies of all the state highways.

Route
At first, SH 30 follows the North Island Main Trunk railway south-east as far as Benneydale. The highway then leaves the railway and turns east, crossing into Manawatū-Whanganui briefly as it passes through the Pureora Forest Park. The road now turns north-east and heads for the Waikato River.

Near Mangakino, SH 30 turns sharply south-east, and bypasses the town of Mangakino. Here, the highway meets the Waikato River at the top of Lake Maraetai, and follows the river upstream to Whakamaru, where the concurrency with SH 32 begins. It crosses the Waikato on top of the Whakamaru hydroelectric dam and leaves SH 32 where it continues eastwards on the opposite bank of the Waikato River to SH 1 at the Atiamuri Dam. SH 30 runs concurrently with SH 1 northwards for six kilometres. The highway leaves SH 1 at Upper Atiamuri, and heads north-east, over the border into Bay of Plenty, towards the tourist town of Rotorua.

The highway passes through the south-east of Rotorua, then heads north through the suburb of Te Ngae, and up the eastern side of Lake Rotorua. Turning east, the road skims the southern edge of Lakes Rotoiti, Rotoehu, and Rotoma. The road turns north-east passing north of the mill town of Kawerau, and through Te Teko, across the Rangitaiki River, to Awakeri.

After crossing SH 2 at Awakeri, the highway turns north and heads towards the coast. The road then turns east, and crosses the Whakatane River. The highway ends just across the river at the roundabout with Landing Road.

Route changes
SH 30's only major route change has occurred at the Whakatane end of the highway. The highway originally ended at Paroa, where the highway met SH 2. Recently, SH 2 has been moved inland, and SH 30 was extended along SH 2's former route to Whakatane.

Spur sections

SH 30 has one spur route – State Highway 30A (SH 30A) in Rotorua.

SH 30A starts west of central Rotorua, at the intersection of Old Taupo Road (SH 5) and Pukuatua Street. SH 30A follows Pukuatua Street eastwards, before going into an S-bend onto Amohau Street, to avoid central Rotorua. The road continues east to Fenton Street, from where SH 30A turns southwest onto a dual carriageway to connect with Te Ngae Road. The highway turns eastwards again, meeting SH 30 at the intersection of Te Ngae Road and Sala Street.

SH 30A was created after SH 5 was moved from its original route through central Rotorua to Old Taupo Road. SH 30A follows part of the old SH 5 route on Amohau Street, between Ranolf Street and Fenton Street.

Major junctions

See also
 List of New Zealand state highways

References

External links
 New Zealand Transport Agency

30
Transport in the Bay of Plenty Region
Transport in Waikato